Voznesenovka is a rural locality (a selo) in Rogozovsky Selsoviet of Romnensky District, Amur Oblast, Russia. The population was 87 as of 2018. There are 3 streets.

Geography 
Voznesenovka is located on the left bank of the Belaya River, 54 km southwest of Romny (the district's administrative centre) by road. Klimovka is the nearest rural locality.

References 

Rural localities in Romnensky District